Peyman Hooshmandzadeh (born 1969 in Tehran) is an Iranian photographer and author.

Education
He studied photography at the Islamic Azad University of Tehran.

Work
He is known for his series of photographs: "Cafe Shooka" and "Teahouse". Today he works as a photojournalist for several newspapers in Iran (Gozaresh e rooz Newspaper (works as a photo-editor), Isatis Monthly Magazine, Asia Newspaper and Goonagoon Newspaper (works as a photo-editor)) and abroad (Reuters, Panos Picture Agency, Polfoto Agency). He published a compilation of short stories "Two Dots" in April 2000 and "When two Sundays meet" was published in April 2001. A compilation of short notes "Alcohollypsis" was published in February 2004. He is also one of the founding members of 135 PHOTOS agency in Iran.

Photographs by Peyman have appeared in several personal and group exhibitions in Tehran: at the Museum of Contemporary Art, the Photography Biennal and the Silk Road Gallery in Tehran. Two times in 1999 and 2000 has won the annual Press Photography Festival award in Tehran.

In November 2007 he participated in the First Biennale of Images of the World (Photoquai), organized by Musée du Quai Branly in Paris.

References

External links
  Peyman Hooshmandzadeh's galleries at Kargah
  Peyman Hooshmandzadeh's galleries at Fanoos
  Peyman Hooshmandzadeh's biography and photos at Silk Road Photography and Art Gallery.
Peyman Hooshmandzadeh auf culturebase.net

1969 births
Living people
Iranian photographers
Iranian male short story writers